Bonfire is a German heavy metal band from Ingolstadt. Formed in 1972 under the name Cacumen, the group's initial lineup after changing its name to Bonfire in 1986 consisted of lead vocalist Claus Lessmann, guitarists Hans Ziller and Horst Maier-Thorn, bassist Jörg Deisinger, and drummer Dominik Hülshorst. The band's current lineup includes Ziller, plus guitarist Frank Pané, bassist Ronnie Parkes (both of whom joined in 2015), drummer Fabio Alessandrini (since 2022), lead vocalist DYAN (since 2022).

History

1972–1994
Bonfire traces its roots back to Cacumen, a band formed by Hans Ziller in 1972 which released a single, two albums and an EP with various lineups. The band changed its name to Bonfire and released Don't Touch the Light, their debut album with the new moniker, in 1986. During the recording of its follow-up Fireworks the next year, Hülshorst left the band and Ken Mary stepped in temporarily as a session performer, before Tommy Wagner joined briefly for a few shows after its release. In December 1987, a full-time replacement for Hülshorst was found in Edgar Patrik, formerly of Sinner and Samson. During the subsequent tour, Maier-Thorn was forced to leave due to rheumatism and was replaced by Gerhard "Angel" Schleifer, also formerly of Sinner. The group recorded its fourth album Point Blank in 1989.

Shortly after recording Point Blank, Ziller left Bonfire in August 1989 due to "personal and musical differences". According to Deisinger, the guitarist was fired following disputes with the band's management over alleged commitment issues. After his dismissal, Ziller reportedly attempted to prevent the release of Point Blank, claiming he had not been "properly credited" on the album. The album was released in October, however, and the band continued as a four-piece. The new lineup released Knock Out in 1991 and recorded the group's first live album Live... the Best, before Lessmann also left in September 1992. Lessmann and Ziller subsequently reunited to release the EP Glaub Dran. In March 1993, Bonfire brought in Michael Bormann as their new frontman, with whom they toured until July 1994.

1996–2015
After a two-year hiatus, Claus Lessmann and Hans Ziller regained the rights to the Bonfire name and reformed the band in 1996 to release Feels Like Comin' Home, an English re-recording of Glaub Dran with additional tracks. The album featured contributions from a wide range of session musicians, as well as former drummer Dominik Hülshorst. Also featured was keyboardist and rhythm guitarist Chris Lausmann, who subsequently became an official member of the band alongside new bassist Uwe Köhler and drummer Jürgen "Bam Bam" Wiehler. The group issued Rebel Soul, Fuel to the Flames, and Strike Ten from 1998 to 2001.

Following the release of Live Over Europe in 2002, Lausmann left Bonfire for "personal reasons". The band continued as a four-piece (with Thomas Streck performing keyboards as a backup member). By early 2006, the group was a five-piece again with the addition of Chris "Yps" Limburg on second guitar, who had previously performed as a guest on 2005's One Acoustic Night. The new lineup released two studio albums – Double X and The Räuber – as well as the live album Double X Vision. In January 2009, Wiehler was replaced by the band's original drummer Dominik Hülshorst. He remained in the band's lineup for three years, releasing Branded, Fireworks Still Alive and Cry for Help, before being replaced by Harry Reischmann in April 2012.

Since 2015

After not releasing a new album since 2011, Bonfire announced at the beginning of 2015 that Lessmann, Limburg and Köhler had all left the band, replaced by David Reece (formerly of Accept), Frank Pané and Ronnie Parkes, respectively. The new lineup issued Glörious in April, before Reischmann was replaced by Tim Briedeband in December. Pearls followed in March 2016, before Reece left that July due to "irreconcilable personal and professional differences". The band's former vocalist Michael Bormann was originally slated to join as Reece's replacement, however he was unable to join until mid-October which led the group to bring in Alexx Stahl as a temporary stand-in for a short run of shows. Due to his performances, he was upgraded to an official member, instead of Bormann.

Between 2017 and 2018, Bonfire released three studio albums with Stahl: Byte the Bullet, Temple of Lies and Legends. In February 2019, drummer Briedeband was replaced by André Hilgers, another former member of Sinner. Fistful of Fire and Roots followed in 2020 and 2021, respectively.

Members

Current

Former

Timeline

Lineups

Footnotes

References

External links
Bonfire official website

Bonfire